Horace C. "Tony" LaBissoniere (September 13, 1896 – January 27, 1972) was an American football player and state legislator.  A native of St. Paul, Minnesota, LaBissoniere graduated from Mechanic Arts High School in St. Paul.  He enrolled at the University of Michigan, where he played football for the Michigan Wolverines.  He later attended the College of St. Thomas.  During World War I, he served in the United States Army and was promoted to the rank of second lieutenant in the infantry.  In 1922, at age 26, LaBissoniere played one year of professional football for the Hammond Pros. LaBissoniere also attended the University of Minnesota where he obtained a degree in dentistry.  He served one term in the Minnesota House of Representatives from 1933 to 1935.  LaBissoniere died in 1972 at age 75; he was buried at Fort Snelling National Cemetery in Minneapolis, Minnesota.

References

Michigan Wolverines football players
Hammond Pros players
1896 births
1972 deaths
Politicians from Saint Paul, Minnesota
University of Minnesota School of Dentistry alumni
Members of the Minnesota House of Representatives
20th-century American politicians
Players of American football from Saint Paul, Minnesota
Military personnel from Minnesota